Ossining Union Free School District is a school district headquartered in the Village of Ossining, Town of Ossining, New York.

The district includes sections of the towns of Ossining and New Castle. Included within the portions of the school district in Ossining Town are Ossining Village and a section of Briarcliff Manor. About 28% of Briarcliff Manor is in the Ossining District, including Chilmark.

 Ray Sanchez is the superintendent: that year he won the "Superintendent to Watch" award.

History
In 2017, after the development Snowden Woods was proposed by a developer, Sanchez stated that it would bring more students which would increase overcrowding in district schools.

Schools
 Secondary
 Ossining High School
 Anne M. Dorner Middle School

 Elementary
 Claremont
 Brookside
 Roosevelt

 Preschool
 Park Early Childhood Center

References

Further reading
  - Written by Robin Kuhl of Ossining

External links
 Ossining Union Free School District

School districts in Westchester County, New York